The first season of Veronica Mars, an American drama television series created by Rob Thomas, premiered on UPN in the United States on September 22, 2004. The series was produced by Warner Bros. Television, Silver Pictures Television and Rob Thomas Productions, and Joel Silver and Thomas served as the executive producers.

The season revolves around Veronica Mars (Kristen Bell), a high school student and private investigator in the fictional Southern California seaside town of Neptune. When Veronica's best friend, Lilly Kane (Amanda Seyfried), is murdered, her life falls apart. Her father, County Sheriff Keith Mars (Enrico Colantoni), accuses Lilly's father of being involved in the murder. This provokes Neptune's wrath and Keith's ousting as sheriff in a recall election. Veronica's mother, Lianne (Corinne Bohrer), develops a drinking problem and leaves town. Veronica's "09er" friends—wealthy students from the fictional 90909 ZIP code—force her to choose between them and her father; she chooses her father. Keith opens a private investigation agency, Mars Investigations, where Veronica works part-time. 

The series was critically acclaimed, and appeared on several fall television best lists. The first season garnered an average of 2.5 million viewers per all 22 episodes in the US. Out of all regular primetime programming that aired during the 2004–2005 American television season, Veronica Mars ranked #148 out of 156, according to the Nielsen ratings system. The pilot was watched by 2.49 million viewers, while the finale was watched by 2.99 million viewers.

Cast

The first season features a cast of seven actors who receive star billing. Kristen Bell portrays the titular Veronica Mars, a high school junior and skilled private detective. Teddy Dunn plays Duncan Kane, Veronica's ex-boyfriend and Lilly's brother. Jason Dohring plays Logan Echolls, the "bad-boy" 09er son of an A-list actor. Percy Daggs III portrays Wallace Fennel, Veronica's best friend and frequent partner in solving mysteries. Francis Capra portrays Eli "Weevil" Navarro, the leader of the PCH Biker gang and Veronica's friend. Enrico Colantoni plays Veronica's father Keith Mars, a private investigator and former Balboa County Sheriff. Sydney Tamiia Poitier plays Mallory Dent, Veronica's journalism teacher at Neptune High. Although she was given series regular billing, Poitier appeared in only four episodes, but was given credit for seven.

Kristen Bell was chosen to play Veronica Mars from more than 500 women who auditioned for the role. Bell felt that it was "just luck" that Rob Thomas saw that "I have some sass to me, and that's exactly what he wanted". Bell thought that it was her cheerleader looks and an outsider's attitude that set her apart from the other women who auditioned. Jason Dohring, who played Logan Echolls, originally auditioned for the role of Duncan Kane. Teddy Dunn originally auditioned for Logan, but ended up portraying Duncan Kane. Dohring felt that his audition for Duncan "was a little dark", and he was told by the producers that it was "not really right". The producers asked Dohring to read for the role of Logan, which involved reading Duncan's lines. Dohring acted one scene from the pilot, in which he shattered the headlights of a car with a crowbar. During the final auditions, Dohring read two times with Bell and met with the studio and the network. When reading with Bell, Dohring acted the whole scene as if he had raped her, and tried to give the character an evil and fun feel. At the time of Dohring's audition for Logan, the character was only going to be a guest star in the pilot.

Thomas described Amanda Seyfried, who portrayed the murdered Lilly Kane, as "the biggest surprise of the year". When casting a series regular, he was able to see all the best actors in town, mainly because they all wanted to be a series regular. When casting Lilly Kane, who would only appear from time-to-time as "the dead girl", Thomas did not receive the same standard of actors. Thomas said that he had "never had a more cut and dry audition" than he did with Seyfried. He said that she was "about 100 times better than anyone else that we saw, she was just spectacular". He continued by saying that she ended up being so good in the series that he used her three or four more times than he initially planned.

Episodes 
When Veronica discovers new evidence that suggests that Lilly's convicted killer is innocent, she decides to investigate the case. As Veronica delves deeper into the murder, she also works on other investigations, seeks her mother's whereabouts and deals with the aftermath of being drugged and raped during an 09er party. Veronica, no longer part of the school's wealthy in-crowd, makes some new friends: Wallace, Neptune High basketball star; Weevil, leader of the PCHers, a biker gang; and Mac, Neptune High's resident computer genius. Using her friends' resources, as well as those provided by her father and his contacts, Veronica gains a reputation for sleuthing and finds her skills in increasingly high demand at her school. Things get more complicated when Veronica falls into a relationship with Lilly's ex-boyfriend Logan, who for a time held Veronica partly responsible for Lilly's death and went out of his way to harass her.

Reception

Critical response

The review aggregator website Rotten Tomatoes reported an approval rating of 97% with an average score of 7.97/10, based on 30 reviews. The website's critics consensus reads, "Veronica Mars is geared towards teens, but its sharp writing, excellent acting and thoughtful subject matter make for an entertaining and attractive drama for TV fans of all ages".

Metacritic gave the season a Metascore—a weighted average based on the impressions of a select fifteen critical reviews—of 81, signifying "universal acclaim". James Poniewozik of Time labeled the series as one of the six best dramas on television. He praised Bell as "a captivating star," and said that the series "uses its pulp premise to dramatize a universal teen experience: that growing up means sleuthing out the mystery of who you really are." Kay McFadden of The Seattle Times called Veronica Mars an update to the "classic California film noir". She felt that Veronica Mars was the best new series on UPN, and that the title character was potentially "this season's most interesting character creation". McFadden described the series as "Alias in its attitude, Raymond Chandler in its writing and The O.C. in its class-consciousness." James South of Paste praised the "crisp, clever writing", and noted the supporting characters were more than just plot devices. He commended Bell's portrayal of Veronica as "simultaneously smart, vulnerable, tough and injured", and found the guest stars were well-utilized. South wrote the remaining cast was "uniformly good", but gave Dohring a special mention for his acting. Stephanie Zacharek of Salon.com praised the first-season finale for being "just the sort of satisfying capper you look for in a series that, week after week, keeps you asking questions".

Robert Abele of LA Weekly said that "in this smart, engaging series about a former popular girl turned crime-solving high school outcast, the hard-boiled dialogue comes from its teen protagonist's mouth in a way that stabs any potential cutesiness in the heart with an ice pick." Joy Press of The Village Voice saw the series as "a sharp teen noir in the making", "[pulsing] with promise". However, Press felt that the series paled somewhat compared to the television series Wonderfalls. Filip Vukcevic of IGN gave the season a positive review, particularly praising the amount of audience participation. However, the reviewer felt that several of the main characters were undeveloped, and that Daggs III and Dunn, as well as their respective characters, were "boring". Vukcevic wrote that while the ultimate resolution to the murder was satisfying, it was not "world-shattering".

Awards
The first season was nominated for seven awards, winning one. In 2005, Veronica Mars received the American Film Institute Award for Television Programs of the Year, and was nominated for the Teen Choice Award for Choice TV Breakout Show, and the Television Critics Association Awards for Outstanding New Program of the Year. Kristen Bell was nominated for the Saturn Award for Best Television Actress, the Satellite Award for Outstanding Actress in a Series, Drama, the Teen Choice Award for Choice TV Breakout Performance, Female, and the Television Critics Association Awards for Individual Achievement in Drama.

Distribution

The CTV Television Network began airing Veronica Mars in Canada as a mid-season replacement on May 30, 2005. Living began showing the series in the United Kingdom in October 2005, averaging 50,000 viewers per episode for its first season. Veronica Mars premiered in Australia by Network Ten on November 28, 2005, where the series saw erratic airings. TV2 began showing the series in New Zealand on July 15, 2005.

The first season of Veronica Mars was released in the US under the title Veronica Mars: The Complete First Season as a widescreen six-disc Region 1 DVD box set on October 11, 2005. In addition to all the episodes that had been aired, DVD extras included an extended "Pilot" episode, over 20 minutes of unaired scenes and an unaired opening sequence. The same set was released on May 16, 2008 in Region 2, and on June 4, 2008 in Region 4. Ben Fritz of Variety criticized the DVD for a lack of special features, but noted that the producers were forced to release the set early to attract more viewers. Fritz believed that Warner Bros. owed fans a better DVD set "chock full of commentaries, interviews and deleted scenes in context". Likewise, Anita Srikamswaren of the Pittsburgh Post-Gazette was surprised by the minimal number of extras. Srikamswaren pointed out that despite the early release, it was still two weeks after the second-season premiere.

References
General
Veronica Mars: Season 1 at IGN
Veronica Mars — The Complete 1st Season at TVShowsOnDVD.com

Specific

External links
 
 
 Mars Investigations

Veronica Mars episodes
2004 American television seasons
2005 American television seasons